Punkunnam is a commercial and residential area in Thrissur city of Kerala in India. It is 2 km away from the Swaraj Round. Punkunnam is home to the renowned Punkunnam Siva Temple. The Sitaram Textiles is situated here. It was established in Punkunnam by TR Ramachandra Iyer in the early 1940s. The spinning wing has the capacity of 12,000 spindles. The mill also has a capacity to process 40,000 meters of cloth every day. Poonkunnam Railway Station provides rail connectivity to other parts of Kerala and India. Punkunnam is witnessing a Real Estate boom as the number of High rise buildings are increasing on a fast pace here.

Religion

Punkunnam have some of the famous temples in Thrissur city like Punkunnam Siva Temple, Punkunnam Seetha Ramaswamy Temple, Kuttankulangara Sri Krishna Temple and Sri Sankarankulangara Temple. Punkunnam Seetha Ramaswamy Temple have got a Ratholsavam festival which is second after Kalpathy ratholsavam. Besides these temples Punkunnam have also got a Christian church.
Pushpagiri Agraharam is situated at Punkunnam where the majority of the residents here are Tamil Brahmins. Kerala Brahmana Sabha Thrissur Unit, is situated at Pushpagiri Agraharam, Punkunnam.

Development
There are several Banks functioning in Punkunnam. Dhanlaxmi Bank (zonal office and Corporate centre), South Indian Bank, Catholic Syrian Bank, Canara Bank, Bank of Baroda, Punjab National Bank, State Bank of India, Federal Bank, HDFC Bank, and State Bank of Hyderabad has got branches at Punkunnam. The bottle neck at poonkunam was over by demolishing the old buildings at the junction with co operation of owners and Thrissur corporation pave a way to developing the place which enhances the connectivity to Puzhakkal padam, the proposed site for mobility hub. Poonkunnam railway station in the coming year will develop as a second station to control the load of passengers at Thrissur main station, many people who are working at Eranakulam catch their train from poonkunnam. The headquarters of Kalyan Jewelers, the largest jewelry chain in India is situated at Punkunnam. The infertility clinic KARE of Dr Krishnankutty is situated at Punkunnam. The Mobility Hub is planing at Puzhakkal Padam (പുഴയ്ക്കല് പാടം) is near to Punkunnam.

Notable residents
 Businessman T.S. Kalyanaraman, a relative of Ramachandra Iyer and the Chairman-cum-Managing Director of Kalyan Jewellers. He is one of the biggest industrialists in India, who has been listed in Forbes magazine's annual tally of billionaires in March 2013. The eldest son of T.K. Seetharama Iyer, he entered the business world first, and later started Kalyan Jewellers in 1993, which is now one of the biggest jewellery groups in India.
 Priya Prakash Varrier (actress, model, and singer)

See also
List of Thrissur Corporation wards

References

External links

Satellite image of Poonkunnam

Suburbs of Thrissur city